Graciela Muslera Méndez (born 1963 in Montevideo) is a Uruguayan architect and politician.

Graduated at the University of the Republic, she worked at BROU and ANV. In 2010 she was appointed Minister of Housing, Territorial Planning and Environment by President José Mujica. In 2012 she was replaced by Francisco Beltrame.

References

Living people
1963 births
University of the Republic (Uruguay) alumni
Uruguayan architects
Broad Front (Uruguay) politicians
Women government ministers of Uruguay
Ministers of Housing, Territorial Planning and Environment of Uruguay